Cnemaspis karsticola , also known as karst-dwelling rock gecko, is a species of gecko endemic to Malaysia.

References

karsticola
Reptiles described in 2008